Daisendorf is a village and a commune with about 1600 inhabitants in south-western Germany. It is part of the Bodensee district, which is part of the Land Baden-Württemberg.

Geography
Daisendorf is situated on a hill about 2 km north of Meersburg. It lies above Lake Constance. It is largely surrounded by the commune of Meersburg, with a short border with Uhldingen-Mühlhofen to the north.

History
Daisendorf was first settled in the 8th century. Given its isolation through marshy terrain and hills, it was only first documented in 1222 when the Abbot of Salem purchased the tithes of the village from the Lords of Vaz. The sovereignty over the village, however, always belonged to the Prince-Bishopric of Constance. The conflict of rights between the abbot and the prince-bishop led to a series of disputes that were mediated by town jurors; the first of which occurred in 1295. Plague, crop failures, and a decrease in the price of grain devastated the community in the 14th century, and slowly the prince-bishopric lost influence in the region. These difficulties induced the prince-bishop to transfer Daisendorf to the Free City of Überlingen in 1334. The prince-bishop reclaimed Daisendorf for 400 guilders in 1507.

In the Reichsdeputationshauptschluss of 1803, in which the principalities of the ecclesiastic rulers were dispersed to the counts and princes of the empire, Daisendorf was given to the Electorate of Baden.

Economy
Daisendorf is a popular tourist destination in the Lake of Constance region, featuring nice views of the Swiss Alps (Säntisregion) and the lake, as well as the charming flair of a diverse rural community.

Culture and sights

Edifices 

The village has an ancient chapel St. Martin, which was built in 1508 and holds unique fresques of the renaissance age.

Regular events 

Daisendorf features several yearly happenings. 
 Carnival season. In South Germany: "Fastnacht", in allemanic idiom "Fasnet" when a tree is planted in the middle of the village ("Narrenbaum")
 Village festivities in July
 Well festivities of carpenter's guild
 Wine festivities at the third weekend of August: this popular Weinfest takes place  as a celebration and tasting of harvest of the regional wineries.

Beauty of nature 

In the east of the village lies pond Neuweiher. This is a hidden water supply in the middle of a lonely wood. According to an old document in the archives of the town of Meersburg ("Meersburger Stadtarchiv") this water storage was built in 1445. In medieval times it was used to flood the town moat of Meersburg. The pond has a surface of about 570 m2 and a maximal depth of 4,1 m. The pond contents are about 101 Mio. liter water. Nowadays the pond and its surroundings are used for recreation purposes. It is also used as static water storage for fire extinction in case of forest fire. It is not allowed to swim in the pond or go boating on it.

Coat of arms

Persons related to the village of Daisendorf 
 Karel Liška (1914–1987): This Czech painter was teacher in the nearby town of Meersburg in the secondary school "Aufbau-Gymnasium". He painted in a natural style various landscapes around Lake Constance and sights of Daisendorf, Meersburg and Prague.

Sources

External links 
 (de) Official Website of Daisendorf

Populated places on Lake Constance
Bodenseekreis